Cold Cuts (also known as Hot Hitz/Kold Kutz) is an unreleased album of outtakes by Paul McCartney. The album was originally planned to be released in 1975 and McCartney revisited the project several times over the years until it was abandoned permanently in the late 1980s.  The songs on the album were recorded during his solo career and with Wings in the 1970s and 1980s.

History

The album was originally conceived as a budget release in 1974, composed of non-album singles and previously unreleased tracks. McCartney began work on the album during Wings' recording sessions in Nashville, Tennessee in July 1974, recording several new songs and overdubbing some previously unused tracks. The album, variously referred to as Cold Cuts or Hot Hitz and Kold Kutz, was slated for release in March 1975 but never materialized. However this was abandoned when McCartney's label commented “Why have cold cuts on a hot hits album?”  The Hot Hitz/Greatest Hits disc idea was later revisited in 1978 as Wings Greatest.

In January 1981, McCartney and Wings recorded additional overdubs for the unreleased tracks with the album slated for release in early 1981. However, Columbia Records was not interested in releasing an album of outtakes and the album was shelved. It was also believed that its release soon after the murder of John Lennon would seem inappropriate.

The project was rebooted again in late 1986 with further overdubs to the McCartney II outtake "Blue Sway" with arranger-producer Richard Niles. The final sessions that attempted an official release of Cold Cuts was in August 1987.  McCartney mixed and edited another version of the album with producer Chris Thomas and engineer Bill Price. That album also went unreleased and after bootleg versions appeared on the market, McCartney abandoned the project permanently.

Possible tracks considered for the album

Below is a list of the possible tracks that were under consideration over the lifetime of the project.  Most of these songs have appeared on various bootlegs connected to the album.

Track listings

To date, an official track listing has never been announced.  However, various bootlegs of the different versions have appeared on the market. These bootleg versions show the Cold Cuts project in its various stages of mixing and different overdubs on the recordings over the years.

1974/1975 version

To date, there is no information about the track selection for the album during this period.  Songs recorded during the Nashville sessions in July 1974 include:

Tracks newly recorded
 "Junior's Farm" - released as a single in 1974
 "Sally G" - released as a single in 1974
 "Send Me The Heart" - included on the 1978 track list for Hot Hitz/Kold Kutz
 "Walking In The Park With Eloise" - released as a single in 1974 under the name The Country Hams

Tracks reworked from early sessions (1971 - 1973)
 "Hey Diddle" - overdubs and mixing
 "Bridge On The River Suite" - overdubs and mixing. Released as a single in 1974 under the name The Country Hams
 "Wide Prairie" - overdubs and mixing

Hot Hitz/Kold Kutz - the 1978 version

Side one:

 "Another Day"
 "Silly Love Songs"
 "Live And Let Die"
 "Junior's Farm"
 "With A Little Luck"
 "Band On The Run"

Side two:

 "Uncle Albert / Admiral Halsey"
 "Hi, Hi, Hi"
 "Let 'Em In"
 "My Love"
 "Jet"
 "Mull Of Kintyre"

Side three:
 "Mama's Little Girl"
 "I Would Only Smile"
 "Tragedy"
 "Night Out"
 "Oriental Nightfish"
 "Lunch Box/Odd Sox"
 "My Carnival"
 "Send Me the Heart"
 "Hey Diddle"
 
Side four:
 "Wild Prairie"
 "Tomorrow" (1975 instrumental version)
 "Proud Mum"
 "Proud Mum (reprise)"
 "Same Time Next Year"
 "Did We Meet Somewhere Before?"

This version was presented to EMI/Capitol in October 1978 as a possible second disc to a hits and rarities compilation to be titled Hot Hitz/Kold Kutz.  The Hot Hitz disc was repackaged as Wings Greatest in November 1978. The Kold Kutz disc would be leaked in 1988 as bootleg LP titled Cold Cuts (Another Early Version).

Cold Cuts - 1980/1981 version

 "A Love for You"
 "Mama's Little Girl"
 "Night Out"
 "Hey Diddle"
 "Best Friend"
 "Tragedy"
 "Waterspout"
 "Same Time Next Year"
 "Cage"
 "My Carnival"
 "Did We Meet Somewhere Before?"
 "Robber's Ball"

McCartney returned to the project in 1980, this time it was to be a standalone album retitled Cold Cuts.  Members of Wings added additional overdubs to the tracks "A Love For You", "Waterspout", "My Carnival" and "Same Time Next Year" in January 1981.  This version also removed the Linda McCartney and Denny Laine vocal tracks in order to create a more commercial offering.

Cold Cuts - 1986 Version
Side one:
 "A Love for You"
 "My Carnival"
 "Waterspout"
 "Mamma's Little Girl"
 "Night Out"
 "Robbers Ball"

Side two:
 "Cage"
 "Did We Meet Somewhere Before?"
 "Hey Diddle"
 "Tragedy"
 "Best Friend"
 "Same Time Next Year"

Further overdubs to "A Love For You" were done in 1986.  This version would be released on the Deluxe Editon of Ram in 2012 as the "Jon Kelly Mix".  In 1987, this leaked onto the bootleg market as an LP titled Cold Cuts (Club Sandwich SP-11)

Cold Cuts - 1987 version
Side one:
 "Blue Sway"
 "Hey Diddle"
 "Mamma's Little Girl"
 "Twice In A Lifetime"
 "Waterspout"
 "A Love for You"
 "Did We Meet Somewhere Before?"

Side two:
 "Same Time Next Year"
 "Best Friend"
 "Cage"
 "Tragedy"
 "Thank You Darling"
 "Night Out"
 "Robbers Ball"

This is the final known version of the album.  This time "Blue Sway" was added to the line-up, with new overdubs from arranger-producer Richard Niles.  Also "A Love for You" was remixed.  According to an interview with McCartney in 1994, this version was to feature album art by Saul Steinberg.  Steinberg's art would later appear on the "Put It There" single cover.

Paul's new manager, Richard Odgen, recommend that at this point in McCartney's career, a release a best of compilation would be a better idea.  So Cold Cuts was scrapped in place of All the Best!.  "Waterspout" was initially planned to be released on that album but was pulled at the last minute (originally the first track on side 2).  All the Best! would be released in November 1987.

Richard Niles' overdubs on "Blue Sway" would be officially released on the Deluxe Edition of McCartney II in 2010.

References

Unreleased albums

Paul McCartney and Wings compilation albums
Albums produced by Paul McCartney
Paul McCartney compilation albums
Parlophone compilation albums